Shashank Khaitan is an Indian film writer, director, actor and producer who works in Hindi films. He is known for his association with Dharma Productions.

Khaitan made his directorial debut with Humpty Sharma Ki Dulhania and went on to direct its spiritual sequel Badrinath Ki Dulhania (2017). His work on the latter earned him a nomination for the Filmfare Award for Best Director. He also directed the romantic drama Dhadak (2018) and a segment of the anthology film Ajeeb Daastaans (2020). In 2019, he became a producer for Dharma Productions, his first production being Good Newwz.

Early life 
Khaitan was born in Calcutta and raised in Nashik, Maharashtra, in a Marwari business family. Khaitan was initially more interested in sports, playing in cricket and tennis tournaments. At the age of 17, he decided to pursue a career in entertainment. He started off as a dance instructor. He soon moved to Mumbai. Khaitan joined Whistling Woods International Institute, a film institute started and supported by veteran filmmaker Subhash Ghai, to break into the film industry. He credits the institute with giving him the technical background. While at Whistling Woods, Khaitan worked on his first attempted film, Sherwani Kahaan Hai, with some of his fellow students, but it was not successfully completed.

In 2008, Khaitan starred as Manohar in Roorkee By-Pass, a 22-minute drama directed by Arundhati Sen Verma, and assisted on the set of Ghai's films Black & White and Yuvvraaj. He also made a brief appearance in Disney's ABCD 2, a sequel to the dance-drama ABCD: Any Body Can Dance.

Career
Khaitan made his directional debut with the romantic comedy Humpty Sharma Ki Dulhania. His initial plan with Humpty Sharma Ki Dulhania was to make it a story of two con artists, similar to Bunty Aur Babli but the script eventually became a story of flirtatious Punjabi boy who engages in a romantic affair with an engaged Punjabi woman. After finishing the first draft of his script, then with the title Humpty Sharma Di Love Story, Khaitan sent it to Dharma Productions which approved producing it with a first time writer-director at the helm. Khaitan cited Dilwale Dulhania Le Jayenge (DDLJ) and Casablanca as inspiration for his script, and the film itself pays homage to DDLJ as well as Kuch Kuch Hota Hai. The film was released on 11 July 2014 to positive critical reception and earned over  worldwide.

Khaitan's next director venture was the romantic comedy Badrinath Ki Dulhania (2017)which reunited hm with Bhatt and Dhawan. It tells the story of an independent young woman (Bhatt) who refuses to conform to patriarchal expectations from her chauvinistic fiancée (Dhawan). Rachel Saltz of The New York Times took note of the film's statement on gender equality. It earned him a nomination for the Filmfare Award for Best Director.

in 2017, Khaitan co-wrote the screenplay and dialogue for the Hindi adaptation of John Green's 2012 novel The Fault in Our Stars with the intent to direct it for Dharma Productions with Janhvi Kapoor and Ishaan Khatter as leads. However, after the production house opted out of the film, he eventually went on to direct them instead in Dhadak, a remake of Marathi film Sairat (2016) which released the following year.

Khaitan turned producer for Dharma Productions with the comedy Good Newwz (2019), which emerged as one of highest-grossing Bollywood film of 2019 and the horror thriller Bhoot – Part One: The Haunted Ship (2020). In 2021, he directed a segment titled Majnu in the Netflix anthology Ajeeb Daastaans.
Khaitan has completed working on the Vicky Kaushal, Kiara Advani and Bhumi Pednekar starter, a comedy thriller titled Govinda Naam Mera which is set to release on 10 June 2022. His next directorial project, Bedhadak, has also been announced. A film that he will also write and produce.

Filmography

Films

As assistant director

As actor

Television

References

External links 
 

Hindi-language film directors
Living people
1982 births